Andraca trilochoides is a moth of the family Endromidae. It is found in south-east Asia, including India, Burma and Vietnam.

Subspecies
Andraca trilochoides trilochoides (India)
Andraca trilochoides roepkei Bryk, 1944 (Burma, Vietnam)

References

Moths described in 1865
Andraca